Stromgren, Strömgren or Strømgren can refer to: 
 Bengt Strömgren, Danish astronomer
 Jo Strømgren, Norwegian choreographer